This page documents all the tornadoes that touched down in the United States in August to September 2007. Tornadoes in the month of January are given with their Fujita Scale intensity while all tornadoes from February and on are given with their Enhanced Fujita Scale intensity. This is because the scale was changed on February 1 due to the National Weather Service implementing a more accurate way to classify tornadoes.

United States Yearly Total

Note: January tornadoes were rated using the old Fujita scale, but are included in the chart above by matching the F rating to the related EF scale rating.

August

There were 87 tornadoes were reported in the US in August, of which 73 were confirmed.

August 2 event

August 3 event

August 5 event

August 8 event

August 16 event

August 17 event

August 18 event

August 19 event

September

There were 63 tornadoes were reported in the US in September, of which 51 were confirmed.

September 13

September 14

See also
 Tornadoes of 2007
 List of United States tornadoes from June to July 2007
 List of United States tornadoes from October to December 2007

Notes

References

F3 tornadoes
Tornadoes of 2007
2007 natural disasters in the United States
2007